Pauline W. Chen (born 1964), is a Taiwanese American surgeon, author, and New York Times columnist. She is known for her 2007 book Final Exam: A Surgeon's Reflections on Mortality as well as her online column "Doctor and Patient". She is also the recipient of numerous awards including the UCLA Outstanding Physician of the Year Award in 1999 and the George Longstreth Humanness Award at Yale for most exemplifying empathy, kindness, and care in an age of advancing technology.

Her parents are immigrants from Taiwan.

Education and training
Chen graduated from The Loomis Chaffee School, then attended Harvard University and the Feinberg School of Medicine at Northwestern University. She completed her general surgical training at Yale University, the National Cancer Institute, and UCLA. She was appointed faculty at UCLA, specializing in liver and kidney transplants and the treatment of cancer.

View on end-of-life care
Through her practice as a transplant surgeon and her experiences of dealing with terminally ill patients, Dr. Chen came to understand that, commonly, doctors consider a patient's death as a sign of imperfect care and thus a personal failure. And doctors hate to fail. Doctors strive to combat their patients’ sicknesses, but if the battle starts to become a losing one then doctors do not prepare their patients for inevitable death. Instead, the battle for life and denial of death continues with the frequent result that many patients die in a hospital's Intensive Care Unit while undergoing painful treatment rather than at home with pain-management and in peace. Dr. Chen wants to change this practice.

References

External links
 Doctor and Patient - Pauline Chen's column
 Final Exam - excerpt from Pauline Chen's book
 - Chinese American Medical Association

                   

Living people
1964 births
The New York Times columnists
American women columnists
American surgeons
American columnists
American non-fiction writers
American people of Taiwanese descent
American women writers of Chinese descent
Harvard University alumni
Feinberg School of Medicine alumni
American women physicians
Loomis Chaffee School alumni
Women surgeons
American women journalists of Asian descent
21st-century American women